Newfield Bridge is a wooden covered bridge over the Cayuga Inlet west branch. It is in Newfield, Tompkins County, New York. It is one of 29 covered bridges in New York State and the oldest covered bridge in New York that continues to carry motor vehicle traffic.

It was added to the National Register of Historic Places in 2000.

Gallery

References

External links

 Newfield Bridge, at New York State Covered Bridge Society
 Newfield Bridge, at Covered Bridges of the Northeast USA

Covered bridges on the National Register of Historic Places in New York (state)
Bridges completed in 1853
Wooden bridges in New York (state)
Buildings and structures in Tompkins County, New York
Tourist attractions in Tompkins County, New York
National Register of Historic Places in Tompkins County, New York
Road bridges on the National Register of Historic Places in New York (state)